Intuition is the third studio album by American R&B singer Jamie Foxx. It was released on December 16, 2008, by J Records.

The album features several guest artists, including T.I., Lil Wayne, Ne-Yo, Kanye West, Fabolous, T-Pain, The-Dream, Lil' Kim, Timbaland and Marsha Ambrosius. The album debuted at number three US Billboard 200 chart, selling 265,000 copies in the first week. The album was certified platinum by the Recording Industry Association of America (RIAA).

Background and composition
Intuition, as Foxx describes it, will focus on the needs and wants of the opposite sex.

Singles

The album's lead single "Just Like Me" featuring T.I., was released on August 19, 2008. The song debuted at number 48 on the Billboard Hot R&B/Hip-Hop Songs chart, before it peaked at number 8. It also peaked at number 49 on the Billboard 100.

The remix to  Ne-Yo's "Miss Independent," titled "She Got Her Own" featuring Ne-Yo; along with an American rapper Fabolous, which was released as the album's second single on December 14, 2008.

The album's third single "Blame It" featuring T-Pain, was released on January 26, 2009. In its first week, "Just Like Me", "Blame It" and "She Got Her Own"  were charted on the top-ten in the Billboard Hot R&B/Hip-Hop Songs at numbers 8, 1, and 2, respectively.

While on the Conan O'Brien show, Foxx performed the remix to "Digital Girl" featuring Canadian rapper Drake, during the interview with MTV News, as he stated; it will be his fourth single from Intuition. The full studio version was leaked and officially released on June 19, 2009, which features guest appearances from Drake, adding Kanye West and The-Dream on this track.

Critical reception

Intuition received mixed reviews from music critics. At Metacritic, which assigns a normalized rating out of 100 to reviews from critics, the album received an average score of 56, which indicates "mixed or average reviews", based on 6 reviews. Sarah Rodman of The Boston Globe reviewed the album positively, stating: "Like many contemporary R&B albums, the cameos sometimes crowd the main attraction, but Foxx is wise enough to intuit when it suits him best to share the spotlight." Claire Lobenfeld of Vibe Magazine had a mixed review for the album, stating: "What is missing from Intuition is a balance between the party records and the slow jams. The division displays a lack of cohesiveness that separates the effort from being a great album into just a collection of potential singles."

Emily Heward of MusicOMH.com, however, was less impressed with the album, commenting: "[Intuition's songs are] lost amidst over-enthusiastic vocal effects" and that "it is hard to recognize the soulful voice that landed him his Oscar."

Commercial performance
Intuition debuted at number three on the US Billboard 200, selling 265,000 copies in the first week. This became Foxx's second US top-ten album. In its second week, the album dropped to number nine on the chart, selling an additional 105,000 copies. In its third week, the album climbed to number eight on the chart, selling 45,000 more copies. In its fourth week, the album remained at number eight on the chart, selling 34,000 copies, bringing its four-week total to 449,000 copies. On May 12, 2009, the album was certified platinum by the Recording Industry Association of America (RIAA) for sales of over one million copies in the United States.

Tour
In May 2009, Foxx announced he was going on tour in the support of his third album Intuition. The 40-city tour kicked off on July 2 in Anaheim and ended in October.

Tour dates

Track listing
Unless otherwise indicated, Information is based on the album's liner notes

Sample credits
 "Number One" contains a sample from "The New Style" performed by Beastie Boys
 "Digital Girl" contains re-sung lyrics from "Can't Believe It" performed by T-Pain and Lil Wayne 
 "She Got Her Own" contains a sample from "My Baby Understands" performed by Donna Summer
 "I Don't Know" contains re-sung lyrics from "Passin' Me By" performed by The Pharcyde, from which in turn samples the Quincy Jones version of "Summer in the City"
 "I Don't Know" also contains a portion of the composition "I Want You" performed by Marvin Gaye

Personnel
Credits are adapted from Allmusic and the album's Liner Notes.
Jamie Foxx - lead vocals (All tracks), background vocals (2)
Kory Aaron - mixing assistant (4, 8, 10–13)
Jim Beanz - background vocals (2)
Andre Bowman - bass played by (10)
Demacio Castellon - audio mixing (2)
Kevin "KD" Davis - audio mixing (6)
Doug Fenske - recording engineer (11), assistant engineer (9)
Jason Fleming - recording engineer 
Chris Godbey - recording engineer, audio mixing (2)
Noel Gourdin - background vocals (8)
Casey Graham - recording engineer 
Mark Gray - instrumental recording engineer (12)
Jaymz Hardy-Martin III - vocal recording engineer 
Kuk Harrell - background vocals (10), vocal recording engineer (1, 4, 10, 12–13)
Christopher "Deep" Henderson - background vocals, drum machine, instruments played by, recording engineer (5)
John Horesco IV - vocal recording engineer
Antonio Jimenez - recording engineer (6)
Brandon Jones - mixing assistant (2)
Jaycen Joshua - audio mixing (1, 3–5, 7-15)
Sean K - music programming (4, 10), instrumental recording engineer (12)
Rico Love - additional vocals (9)
Phil Margaziotis - recording engineer (9)
Brandon R. Melanchon - background vocals (5)
Chris "Tek" O'Ryan - instrumental recording engineer (4, 12)
Dave Pensado - audio mixing (1, 3–5, 7-15)
DeMonica Plummer - sample clearance agent
Orlando Rashid - recording engineer (15)
Salaam Remi - musical arrangements, Fender Rhodes keyboard, drums, bass played by (8)
D. P. Samuels - mixing assistant (11)
Franklin Emmanuel Socorro - recording engineer (8)
Staybent Krunk-a-Delic - background vocals, additional keyboards (8)
Tank - instruments performed by (14)
Brian "B-Luv" Thomas - instrumental recording engineer (4, 10, 13)
Pat Thrall - recording engineer (additional on 1, instrumental on 4, 10, 13)
Randy Urbanski - mixing assistant (1, 3, 7, 9-10, 14–15)
Julian Vasquez - recording engineer (2)
Wizard - keyboards (10)
Andrew Wright - recording engineer, audio mixing (3)
Andrew Wuepper - mixing assistant (1, 7, 9-10, 14–15)
Jordan "DJ Swivel" Young - recording engineer (6)

Charts

Weekly charts

Year-end charts

Certifications

Release history

References

Jamie Foxx albums
2008 albums
J Records albums
Albums produced by Jerome "J-Roc" Harmon
Albums produced by Just Blaze
Albums produced by Salaam Remi
Albums produced by Stargate
Albums produced by Timbaland
Albums produced by Tricky Stewart